In statistical decision theory, a randomised decision rule or mixed decision rule is a decision rule that associates probabilities with deterministic decision rules. In finite decision problems, randomised decision rules define a risk set which is the convex hull of the risk points of the nonrandomised decision rules.

As nonrandomised alternatives always exist to randomised Bayes rules, randomisation is not needed in Bayesian statistics, although frequentist statistical theory sometimes requires the use of randomised rules to satisfy optimality conditions such as minimax, most notably when deriving confidence intervals and hypothesis tests about discrete probability distributions.

A statistical test making use of a randomized decision rule is called a randomized test.

Definition and interpretation 
Let  be a set of non-randomised decision rules with associated probabilities . This rule can be treated as a random experiment in which the decision rules  are selected with probabilities  respectively.

Alternatively, a randomised decision rule may assign probabilities directly on elements of the actions space  for each member of the sample space. More formally,  denotes the probability that an action  is chosen. Under this approach, its loss function is also defined directly as: .

The introduction of randomised decision rules thus creates a larger decision space from which the statistician may choose his decision. As non-randomised decision rules are a special case of randomised decision rules where one decision or action has probability 1, the original decision space  is a proper subset of the new decision space .

Selection of randomised decision rules 

As with nonrandomised decision rules, randomised decision rules may satisfy favourable properties such as admissibility, minimaxity and Bayes. This shall be illustrated in the case of a finite decision problem, i.e. a problem where the parameter space is a finite set of, say,  elements.
Note that by the definition of the randomised decision rule, the risk set is the convex hull of the risks .

An example is shown on the right.

Admissibility
An admissible decision rule is one that is not dominated by any other decision rule, i.e. there is no decision rule that has equal risk as or lower risk than it for all parameters and strictly lower risk than it for some parameter. In a finite decision problem, the risk point of an admissible decision rule has either lower x-coordinates or y-coordinates than all other risk points or, more formally, it is the set of rules with risk points of the form  such that . Thus the left side of the lower boundary of the risk set is the set of admissible decision rules.

Minimax 
Sometimes, a randomised decision rule may perform better than all other nonrandomised decision rules in this regard.

In a finite decision problem with two possible parameters, the minimax rule can be found by considering the family of squares .

If the risk set intersects the line , then the admissible decision rule lying on the line is minimax.  If  or  holds for every point in the risk set, then the minimax rule can either be an extreme point (i.e. a nonrandomised decision rule) or a line connecting two extreme points (nonrandomised decision rules).

Bayes 
A randomised Bayes rule is one that has infimum Bayes risk  among all decision rules. The minimum Bayes risk for the decision problem is therefore the smallest  such that the line touches the risk set. This line may either touch only one extreme point of the risk set, i.e. correspond to a nonrandomised decision rule, or overlap with an entire side of the risk set, i.e. correspond to two nonrandomised decision rules and randomised decision rules combining the two. This is illustrated by the three situations below:

As different priors result in different slopes, the set of all rules that are Bayes with respect to some prior are the same as the set of admissible rules.

Note that no situation is possible where a nonrandomised Bayes rule does not exist but a randomised Bayes rule does. The existence of a randomised Bayes rule implies the existence of a nonrandomised Bayes rule. This is also true in the general case, even with infinite parameter space, infinite Bayes risk, and regardless of whether the infimum Bayes risk can be attained. This supports the intuitive notion that the statistician need not utilise randomisation to arrive at statistical decisions.

In practice 
As randomised Bayes rules always have nonrandomised alternatives, they are unnecessary in Bayesian statistics. However, in frequentist statistics, randomised rules are theoretically necessary under certain situations, and were thought to be useful in practice when they were first invented: Egon Pearson forecast that 
they 'will not meet with strong objection'. However, few statisticians actually implement them nowadays.

Randomised test 

Randomized tests should not be confused with permutation tests.

In the usual formulation of the likelihood ratio test, the null hypothesis is rejected whenever the likelihood ratio  is smaller than some constant , and accepted otherwise. However, this is sometimes problematic when  is discrete under the null hypothesis, when  is possible.

A solution is to define a test function , whose value is the probability at which the null hypothesis is accepted:

This can be interpreted as flipping a biased coin with a probability  of returning heads whenever  and rejecting the null hypothesis if a heads turns up.

A generalised form of the Neyman–Pearson lemma states that this test has maximum power among all tests at the same significance level , that such a test must exist for any significance level , and that the test is unique under normal situations.

As an example, consider the case where the underlying distribution is Bernoulli with probability , and we would like to test the null hypothesis  against the alternative hypothesis . It is natural to choose some  such that , and reject the null whenever , where  is the test statistic. However, to take into account cases where  , we define the test function:

where  is chosen such that .

Randomised confidence intervals 
An analogous problem arises in the construction of confidence intervals. For instance, the Clopper-Pearson interval is always conservative because of the discrete nature of the binomial distribution.

where  is a uniform random variable on (0, 1).

See also 
 Mixed strategy
 Linear programming

Footnotes

Bibliography

 
 
 
 
 

Decision theory
Statistical inference